Ayodhya is an opera by Somtow Sucharitkul.  It premiered on November 16, 2006 at the Thailand Cultural Center in Bangkok, in a production directed by Dutch director Hans Nieuwenhuis and featuring Michael Chance as Ganesha, Nancy Yuen as Sita, Charles Hens as Rama, and John Ames as Ravan.  The libretto is a distillation of the entire Ramayana epic into a single evening.

The opera was composed as a special tribute to the King of Thailand as part of the nationwide celebration of the King's Sixtieth Regnal Year.  However, the opening was marred by a censorship debate which was widely discussed in the international press.

References 

Operas by Somtow Sucharitkul
2006 operas
Operas
English-language operas